The Australian Dancing Society (ADS) Ltd is an organisation which represents the interests of dancesport and ballroom dancing within Australia.

History 
ADS was formed in 1942 by Mickey Powell. Powell was president of the Australian Dancing Society in its early years.
By 1944 it was conducting grade and medal tests and conducting examinations for teachers' accreditation.
By 1950 it had 10,000 members and in that year became affiliated with the International Council of Ballroom Dancing, with headquarters in England.

Organisation 
The ADS has branches in all states of Australia and organizes in excess of 30 dancesport competitions every year.

Responsibilities 
The ADS is a not for profit organisation that provides comprehensive service at all levels and facets of the sport of dance.

See also
New Vogue (dance)

References

External links

1942 establishments in Australia
Ballroom dance
Dance in Australia
Dancesport organizations